Tantawan Park is a historical park in Cotabato City. Located on the corner  of Quezon Avenue and Sinsuat Avenue, next to the Central Bank of The Philippines - Cotabato City Branch and Immaculate Conception Cathedral Cotabato, locals use the park for the relaxing massage offered by the therapist while viewing the busy street and the  monument of Muhammad Kudarat.

Situated at the foot of Pedro Colina Hill,  also known as Tantawan, it is a historical site in Mindanao. It served as the watch tower of the natives during their defence of the island from the invasion of the Spaniards dated 1635 to 1645.

Cotabato City
Geography of Maguindanao del Norte
Parks in the Philippines